Melanchthonhaus may refer to:

 Melanchthonhaus (Bretten), a museum and research facility of the Protestant Reformation in Bretten
 Melanchthonhaus (Wittenberg), a writer's house museum in Lutherstadt Wittenberg